Arbaiyah Abdul Manan, known professionally as Abby Abadi (born 1 December 1977) is a Malaysian singer, host and actress. She is best known as one of the members of the Malaysian girl group Elite, which gained success in the late 1990s and early 2000s and known for her role as Inspector (later DSP) Aleeza in the longest-running Malaysian action drama series Gerak Khas, where she is one of the six original cast members. She won the Anugerah Bintang Popular Berita Harian for Most Popular TV Actress five times, between 2000, 2001, 2002, and 2003.

Career
Abby Abadi started out as one of the members of the KRU's first Malaysian girl group named Elite and the when she was just 18 years old. Abadi has released two albums with the group and left in 1998.

Her acting career started in 1999 when she landed the lead role as Inspector (later DSP) Aleeza in longest-running Malaysian police procedural television series, Gerak Khas where she also sang the series' theme music with co-star AC Mizal. The series was originally set as a year-long series, but due to its continuous success and consistent top rating, the series was extended for an indefinite time until it finally ended on March 27, 2021 with a total of 20 seasons and 1,054 episodes. Abadi appeared in all seasons except seasons 14 to 18.

Personal life
Abby Abadi married her Gerak Khas co-star, Norman Hakim, in 2002. Norman and Abby was legally divorced (talak satu) at the Gombak Timur Shariah Court in 2008. They have three children together: Mohamed Danish Hakim, Marissa Dania, and Maria Danisha.

Four years after her divorce from Norman Hakim, Abby married Muhammad Noor Farhan Che Bakar. He is 12 years younger than her. Their marriage only lasted for a year. They divorced on 9 May 2014.

She married her third husband, Muhammad Faizal Zakari, in 2015.

Involvement in politics 
Abby Abadi joined the Malaysian Islamic Party (PAS) and received criticism for the decision due to her lifestyle. Abby is working with Hairi Othman to improve the image of PAS.

She was said to have married a PAS assembly member Mohd Zaki Ibrahim. However, she denied the claims.

Controversy

Controversial comments about Islam
Abby is quite vocal in voicing her opinion on Islamic teaching. Ever since she became a member of PAS, she began giving sermons and teachings.

Because most of her views contradicts the teachings of Islam, Abby was condemned in the Malaysian blogosphere. In a Malay language portal, it shows that Abby stated that, the reason for all the things that she has done in PAS is for the benefits of her friends, family and the society. She believes that her work in PAS can guarantee her salvation in the afterlife.

Feud with religious scholar
Because of her controversial comments on Islam, Abby was criticized by Mohd Asri Zainul Abidin. Abby and Mohd Asri fight on Facebook And Twitter. Abby has also been questioned by PAS member and religious teacher Ustaz Azhar Idrus. Azhar Idrus suggested that Abby must further her studies and conduct extensive research on subjects that she wanted to comment.

Filmography

Film

Television series

Telemovie

Television

References

External links
 

1977 births
Living people
Malaysian television actresses
People from Kuala Lumpur
Malaysian people of Malay descent
Malaysian Muslims
20th-century Malaysian actresses
21st-century Malaysian actresses